was an autobahn in north Germany, which was colloquially referred to as the Maschener Autobahn ("Maschen Motorway"). It began near Hamburg and ran in an easterly direction for 28 kilometres to Lüneburg, where it became the B 4 and later the  B 209. The motorway had two lanes throughout and was opened in four sections:
1985: AK Maschen – AS Maschen
1987: AS Maschen – AS Winsen (Luhe)-West
1991: AS Winsen (Luhe)-West – AS Winsen (Luhe)-Ost
1995: AS Winsen (Luhe)-Ost – Lüneburg-Nord

When the planned junction from the A 250 to the A 39 from Wolfsburg is built there will be a motorway straight through from the industrial region of Brunswick and Salzgitter to the Hamburg ports. The motorway was completed in 2010 and the A 250 became part of the A 39.

Exit list

External links 

 

250
A250
Lüneburg